Mustansir Barma is an Indian scientist specializing in Statistical Physics. He was former Director of the Tata Institute of Fundamental Research  from 2007 to 2014.

Early life
Mustansir Barma was born in Mumbai to a Dawoodi Bohra family.

Awards and honours
 Young Scientist Award of the Indian National Science Academy (1980).
 Associate of the Indian Academy of Sciences (1983 – 86).
 Shanti Swarup Bhatnagar Prize for the Physical Sciences awarded by the CSIR (1995).
 Honorary faculty member, Jawaharlal Nehru Centre for Advanced Scientific Research, Bangalore (1998 – 2001).
 DAE Raja Ramanna Prize Lecture in Physics (2004).
 S.N. Bose Birth Centenary Award of the Indian Science Congress (2007).
 J.C. Bose Fellowship of the Department of Science and Technology (2007).
 Seventh Abdus Salam Memorial Lecture, Jamia Millia Islamia, New Delhi (2009).
 R.S. Goyal Prize for Physics (2006), awarded in 2010.
 Padma Shri Award (2013)

References

20th-century Indian physicists
Dawoodi Bohras
Indian Ismailis
Living people
Recipients of the Padma Shri in science & engineering
1950 births